The 1996 NCAA Division I men's ice hockey tournament involved 12 schools playing in single-elimination tournament to determine the national champion of men's National Collegiate Athletic Association (NCAA) Division I college ice hockey. It began on March 22, 1996, and ended with the championship game on March 30. A total of 11 games were played. The top two seeds in each region received a bye into the tournament quarterfinals.

In the regional semifinals, Michigan's Mike Legg scored one of the most memorable goals in hockey history.

The University of Michigan, coached by Red Berenson, won the national championship with a 3–2 victory over Colorado College in overtime in front of 12,957 fans.

Qualifying teams
The at-large bids and seeding for each team in the tournament were announced after the conference tournaments concluded. The Central Collegiate Hockey Association (CCHA) had four teams receive a berth in the tournament, the ECAC and Hockey East each had three teams receive a berth in the tournament, while the Western Collegiate Hockey Association (WCHA) had two berths.

Game locations
 East Regional – Knickerbocker Arena, Albany, NY
 West Regional – Munn Ice Arena, East Lansing, MI
 Frozen Four – Riverfront Coliseum, Cincinnati, OH

Tournament bracket

Note: * denotes overtime period(s)

Regional Quarterfinals

East Regional

(3) Lake Superior State vs. (6) Cornell

(4) Western Michigan vs. (5) Clarkson

West Regional

(3) Minnesota vs. (6) Providence

(4) Massachusetts-Lowell vs. (5) Michigan State

Regional semifinals

East Regional

(1) Boston University vs. (5) Clarkson

(2) Vermont vs. (3) Lake Superior State

West Regional

(1) Colorado College vs. (4) Massachusetts-Lowell

(2) Michigan vs. (3) Minnesota

Frozen Four

National semifinal

(E1) Boston University vs. (W2) Michigan

(E2) Vermont vs. (W1) Colorado College

National Championship

(W2) Michigan vs. (W1) Colorado College

All-Tournament team
G: Marty Turco (Michigan)
D: Steven Halko (Michigan)
D: Scott Swanson (Colorado College)
F: Peter Geronazzo (Colorado College)
F: Brendan Morrison* (Michigan)
F: Martin St. Louis (Vermont)
* Most Outstanding Player(s)

Record by conference

References

Tournament
NCAA Division I men's ice hockey tournament
NCAA Division I men's ice hockey tournament
NCAA Division I men's ice hockey tournament
NCAA Division I men's ice hockey tournament
NCAA Division I men's ice hockey tournament
1990s in Cincinnati
Ice hockey competitions in Albany, New York
Ice hockey competitions in Michigan
Ice hockey competitions in Cincinnati
Sports competitions in East Lansing, Michigan